is a Japanese football player. She plays for Changnyeong WFC in the WK League. She played for Japan national team.

Club career
Kiryu was born in Kanagawa Prefecture on 31 October 1989. From 2007, she played for Nippon TV Beleza in Japan's first-division L.League. During her career with the team, she scored 25 goals in her 94 appearances. In February 2014, she signed with Sky Blue FC in the National Women's Soccer League, where she played for one season before returning to Beleza. In January 2016, Kiryu signed with Chinese Division 2 club Guangdong Haiyin, located in the Chinese city of Guangzhou. In 2017, she returned to Japan and joined Okayama Yunogo Belle.

National team career
On 13 January 2010, Kiryu debuted for Japan national team against Denmark. She was a member of Japan for 2014 Asian Cup and Japan won the championship. She played 16 games and scored 3 goals for Japan until 2014.

National team statistics

International goals

Honors and awards
Individual
 L.League Best XI: 2013

Club
 L.League Division 1 League Champions: 2008, 2010
 L.League Division 1 League Runners-up: 2009, 2011, 2012, 2013
 Empress's Cup: 2008, 2009
 Nadeshiko League Cup: 2007, 2010, 2012
 Japan/Korea Women's League Championship: 2011

References

External links

 Nanase "Na-Na" Kiryu profile at National Women's Soccer League
 Nanase Kiryu profile at Sky Blue FC

1989 births
Living people
Association football people from Kanagawa Prefecture
Japanese women's footballers
Japan women's international footballers
Nadeshiko League players
National Women's Soccer League players
Nippon TV Tokyo Verdy Beleza players
NJ/NY Gotham FC players
Okayama Yunogo Belle players
Japanese expatriate footballers
Japanese expatriate sportspeople in the United States
Expatriate women's soccer players in the United States
Asian Games medalists in football
Asian Games silver medalists for Japan
Footballers at the 2014 Asian Games
Women's association football forwards
Medalists at the 2014 Asian Games